In Greek mythology, Lycomedes (/ˌlaɪkəˈmiːdiːz/; Ancient Greek: Λυκομήδης) may refer to several characters:

 Lycomedes, a king of Scyros and father of Deidamia, mother of Neoptolemus by Achilles.
 Lycomedes, a son of Creon, one of the Greek warriors at Troy; he was represented  by Polygnotus in the Lesche at Delphi as wounded (supposedly by Agenor) in the wrist, in the arm and in the head.
 Lycomedes, son of Apollo and Parthenope, daughter of King Ancaeus of Samos.
 Lycomedes, a Cretan suitor of Helen.

Notes

References 

 Apollodorus, The Library with an English Translation by Sir James George Frazer, F.B.A., F.R.S. in 2 Volumes, Cambridge, MA, Harvard University Press; London, William Heinemann Ltd. 1921. . Online version at the Perseus Digital Library. Greek text available from the same website.
Pausanias, Description of Greece with an English Translation by W.H.S. Jones, Litt.D., and H.A. Ormerod, M.A., in 4 Volumes. Cambridge, MA, Harvard University Press; London, William Heinemann Ltd. 1918. . Online version at the Perseus Digital Library
 Pausanias, Graeciae Descriptio. 3 vols. Leipzig, Teubner. 1903.  Greek text available at the Perseus Digital Library.

Children of Apollo
Cretan characters in Greek mythology
Cretan mythology